A burgh constituency is a type of parliamentary constituency in Scotland. It is a constituency which is predominantly urban, and on this basis has been designated as a burgh constituency. They are the successors of the historic parliamentary burghs of the Parliament of Scotland.

In 1708 parliamentary burghs were allocated to districts of burghs, each district serving as a constituency of the Parliament of Great Britain. In the Parliament of the United Kingdom, from 1801 onwards, this district system continued until it was gradually abolished during the first half of the 20th century.

Modern burgh constituencies are much like county constituencies in the way that their boundaries are drawn, but election candidates are allowed lower expenses, as they do not need to travel as much.  For British House of Commons elections, the allowance is £7,150 and 5p per elector.  For by-elections, the allowance is always £100,000.

House of Commons constituencies were formerly used for elections to the Scottish Parliament, created in 1999, but they have been de-linked since 2005, by reducing the number of Commons constituencies in Scotland without a corresponding change in the Scottish Parliament.  The historic distinction between county and burgh constituencies is maintained in both sets of constituencies.

For Scottish Parliament elections, the allowance is £5,761 and 4.8p per elector.

The following constituencies are designated as burgh constituencies in the Scottish Parliament:
 Aberdeen Central
 Aberdeen Donside
 Airdrie and Shotts
 Ayr
 Coatbridge and Chryston
 Dundee City East
 Dundee City West
 Edinburgh Central
 Edinburgh Eastern
 Edinburgh Northern and Leith
 Edinburgh Pentlands
 Edinburgh Southern
 Edinburgh Western
 Glasgow Anniesland
 Glasgow Cathcart
 Glasgow Kelvin
 Glasgow Maryhill and Springburn
 Glasgow Pollok
 Glasgow Provan
 Glasgow Shettleston
 Glasgow Southside
 Hamilton, Larkhall and Stonehouse
 Motherwell and Wishaw
 Paisley
 Rutherglen
 Uddingston and Bellshill

See also
 Scottish Parliament constituencies
 United Kingdom constituencies
 Borough constituency (England and Wales)

Burghs
Politics of Scotland

Constituencies of the Parliament of the United Kingdom